The Suleja Emirate (Hausa: Masarautar Suleja) is a Hausa principality in what is now Niger State, Nigeria. The emirate was established as the Abuja Emirate during the 19th century, located just north of the site of the present-day federal capital city named Abuja. When the new city was established, the emirate and its capital were renamed the Suleja Emirate and Suleja.
The emirate covers about 1,150 square miles (2,980 square km) of wooded savanna area. Suleja Emirate, Kontagora Emirate, Borgu Emirate, Agaie Emirate and Kagara Emirate were the major Emirates in Niger state.

History
The current emirate originally included four small Koro chiefdoms that paid tribute to the Hausa Zazzau Emirate. After warriors of the Fulani jihad (holy war) captured Zaria, Zazzau's capital, 137 miles (220 km) north-northeast about 1804, Muhammadu Makau, sarki (king) of Zazzau, led many of the Hausa nobility to the Koro town of Zuba. Abu Ja (Jatau), his brother and successor as Sarkin Zazzau, founded Abuja town in 1828, began construction of its wall a year later, and proclaimed himself the first sarki of Abuja, while retaining the title Sarkin Zazzau'. Withstanding Zaria attacks, the Abuja emirate remained an independent Hausa refuge. Trade with the Fulani emirates of Bida (to the west) and Zaria began in Emir Abu Kwaka's reign (1851–77).

When Abuja's leaders disrupted the trade route between Lokoja and Zaria in 1902, the British occupied the town. Alluvial tin mining began in Emir Musa Angulu's reign (1917–44).
In 1976 a large part of the emirate plus territory from other states became the Federal Capital Territory, centred on the new city of Abuja. The emirate was renamed Suleja, based on the renamed town of Suleja which remained in Niger State.

Awwal Ibrahim became the Emir, or Sarkin Zazzau, of Suleja in 1993.
His accession resulted in rioting and destruction of property by opponents.
He was deposed on 10 May 1994 by General Sani Abacha.
After the return to democracy, Awwal Ibrahim was restored to his title of Emir of Suleja on 17 January 2000.
His restoration again caused a series of violent clashes, forcing the government to call in anti-riot troopers and impose a 20-hour curfew.

List of rulers
Following is a list of the rulers of the emirate.

References

Niger State
Nigerian traditional states
Emirates